Dariyabad is a locality in  of Allahabad, Uttar Pradesh, India.
Dariyabad is a neighbor of Meerapur. Dariyabad is surrounded by the Yamuna River from one side. The leader of the Samajwadi Party, Arvind Singh Gope, is the Mp of the Dariyabad seat in Barabanki. The Takshakeswar temple, dedicated to Shiva, is in Bariyabad.

References 

Neighbourhoods in Allahabad